The Chinese Ambassador to Zambia is the official representative of the People's Republic of China to the Republic of Zambia.

List of representatives

See also
China–Zambia relations

References 

 
Zambia
China